A taqtūqa (Arabic: طـقطـوقـة plural: taqātīq, طـقـاطـيـق) is a genre of light Arabic vocal music sung in regional or colloquial Arabic. It was associated with female vocalists around the turn of the 20th century, and became very popular during the first decades of the 20th century, as the gramophone and cinema grew in popularity.

The famous Egyptian singer Umm Kulthum recorded taqtuqas early in her career; her first was "Illi Habbik Ya Hanah" (Joy to Him Who Loved You), composed in 1925 by Zakariyya Ahmad.

References

Arabic music
Vocal music
Popular music